The Winds of Jarrah is a 1983 Australian film adapted from a Mills & Boon novel. It was never released to cinemas.

The film was financed in part by the Australian Film Commission and the Film Corporation of Western Australia.

Screenwriter Bob Ellis later called it a "shocking film.. which, would you believe, started out as a very good script and only about one sentence of it survived."

References

External links

The Winds of Jarrah at Oz Movies

Australian romantic drama films
1983 films
1980s English-language films
1980s Australian films